The Piney Point Formation is a geologic formation in Virginia. It preserves fossils dating back to the Lutetian Stage of the Eocene Epoch of the Paleogene period.

Species
The following species are known from this formation. Keep in mind, this formation is vastly understudied, so the fauna represented is poorly known.

Chondrichthyans
Carcharocles auriculatus
Galeocerdo eaglesomi
Nebrius thielensis
Striatolamia macrota
Carcharias hopei
Carcharias acutissima
Jaekelotodus trigonalis
Isurus praecursor
Scyliorhinus gilbberti
Abdounia beaugei
Abdounia lapierrei
Abdounia recticona
Adbounia spp.
Galeocerdo latidens
Hemipristis curvatus?
Carcarhinus gibbesi
Galeorhinus ypresiensis
Galeorhinus sp.
Physogaleus secundus
Coupatezia woutersi
Pristis lathami
Rhynchobatus vincenti
Rhinobatis bruxelliensis
Aetobatus irregularis
Myliobatis dixoni
Myliobatis spp.

Chelonians
Allaeochelys sp.

Cetaceans
Basilotritus woodwardi

Invertebrates
Cubitostrea sellaeformis
Anomia lisbonensis
Plicatula fliamentosa
"Pecten" sp. (At least 3 distinct species)
Glycymeris lisbonensis
Leda semen
Leda coelatella
Venericardia rotunda
Macrocallista perovata
Anapteris regalis
Caestocorbula fossata
Corbula sp.
Turritella nasuta
Dentalium sp. (at least 2 distinct species)

See also

 List of fossiliferous stratigraphic units in Virginia
 Paleontology in Virginia

References

 

Paleogene geology of Virginia